John Rigby may refer to:

John Rigby (martyr) (c. 1570–1600), English Catholic and martyr
John Rigby (gunmaker) (1892–1916), descendant of the founder of John Rigby & Co.
Sir John Rigby (politician) (1834–1903), British lawyer and politician
John Rigby (artist) (1922–2012), Australian artist, known for his bush landscapes
John Rigby (rower) (1906–1975), New Zealand rower
John E. Rigby (1923–1972), Canadian politician
John Rigby (mathematician) (1933–2014), English mathematician
John Rigby (alpine skier) (born 1942), British former alpine skier
John Rigby (swimmer) (born 1942), Australian Olympic swimmer

See also
Jon Rigby (born 1965), footballer
John Rigby & Company gun and rifle makers of Dublin and London